Foredge shelving (or fore-edge shelving) is a book shelving technique. Books are typically shelved upright with the spines facing outwards.  However, when a book is too tall to stand upright on a shelf it may be shelved horizontally, i.e., flat, or with the spine resting on the shelf (spine shelving), or alternatively with the foredge, i.e., the part of the book opposite the spine, resting on the shelf, (foredge shelving).

Foredge shelving may damage the spine and joints of a book. A possible reason for doing it was that leaving the spine facing up makes it easier to see the call number, which is usually located on the spine.

The Northeast Document Conservation Center (NEDCC) recommends that books should never be stored on the foredge. Instead, it is recommended that either the shelves should be rearranged to accommodate the books standing upright, or the books should be moved to other shelves that can accommodate the books standing upright.

In a historical context, fore-edge shelving means the practice of placing books on shelves with the fore-edges facing outwards. "This was normal practice in libraries for much of the sixteenth century for two reasons. One is that writing or printing the title and author’s name on the spine was not common until the 17th century and therefore the ‘back’ of the book was purely functional, holding the pages together. The other is that books, like the manuscripts which preceded them, were often held securely by a chain fastened to a metal staple on the fore-edge of the wooden board."

See also
 Chained library

References

External links
Proper Care of Library Books: A Guide for Museum Staff. American Museum of Natural History Research Library. Retrieved on July 23, 2015. The first rule on this page says: "Do not leave books on shelves or carts with the foredge down. This damages the spine and joints."
Holdings Maintenance. National Archives and Records Administration. Retrieved on July 29, 2008. Accessible at https://www.archives.gov/preservation/holdings-maintenance. "storing a book with the spine up may cause the text to pull out of the binding due to its weight."
 MS Storage Equipment

Book terminology